Hoseyniyeh (also Romanized as Ḩoseynīyeh; also known as Ḩoseynīyeh-ye Khodā Dād, Ḩoseynīyeh-ye ‘Olyā, Qal‘eh Hūsaīnīyeh, and Ḩoseymīeh) is a city and capital of Alvar-e Garmsiri District, in Andimeshk County, Khuzestan Province, Iran.  At the 2006 census, its population was 1,863, in 405 families.

References

Populated places in Andimeshk County

Cities in Khuzestan Province